Connor Hawke is a fictional DC Comics superhero who operated as the second Green Arrow, created by Kelley Puckett and Jim Aparo. In the post-Zero Hour continuity, Connor is the eldest son of Oliver Queen, the original Green Arrow, and his former girlfriend from college Sandra "Moonday" Hawke, making him Oliver's heir of his estates and the Green Arrow legacy. Connor Hawke first appeared in Green Arrow (vol. 2) #0 (1994).

The character's prominence in DC comics has gone up and down at many points following his short-lived tenure as a full-time replacement for Oliver Queen. For a decade, from 2011 to 2021, the character was largely absent after DC attempted to make Oliver Queen a younger man again and to reintroduce his supporting cast gradually as part of its The New 52 relaunch, although versions of the character continued to appear in comics set elsewhere in the DC Comics Multiverse. With the publisher's Infinite Frontier initiative in 2021, Connor is restored to prominence, reintroduced as the second Green Arrow and Oliver's illegitimate son. The publisher has also chosen to place greater emphasis on Connor's multi-racial background, as a superhero of mixed European, African-American and Korean ancestry, with his mother and Korean grandmother added to his supporting cast. The DC Pride 2022 anthology confirmed that Connor is asexual.

Outside of comics, multiple versions of Connor appear in The CW's Arrowverse, where Connor Hawke is the pseudonym of a son of supporting character John Diggle, played by Joseph David-Jones. Separately, another loose adaptation of Connor's comic book origin story involves Oliver discovering he has an illegitimate son named William Clayton, is also depicted on Arrow with the present day version played by Jack Moore and the future adult version played by Ben Lewis.

Fictional character biography

Meeting Oliver Queen
Connor Hawke met Oliver Queen after Oliver came to stay at the ashram where Connor had been studying for some years. Oliver who had previously retreated to the ashram decades before, looking for peace after accidentally killing a criminal (in The Flash #217), returned to the ashram under similar circumstances, haunted by the thought that he had killed his former best friend Hal Jordan, who, at the time, was involuntarily serving as the host of the supervillain Parallax. Thanks to Connor, who was a big fan of Green Arrow, Oliver was able to regain a semblance of inner peace and venture out into the world again, especially after numerous attempts on his life had been made.

Connor decided to journey with Oliver, and created a costume similar to his. Connor served as Oliver's sidekick, also meeting with Eddie Fyers, the former federal agent that acted as a form of counsel for Oliver. It was during this time that Oliver learned about his connection to Connor from the ghost of Hal Jordan: Connor was Oliver's son, conceived during Oliver's college years.Eddie Fyers had already deduced this, but Oliver did not take the revelation well. He subsequently agreed to go undercover in an eco-terrorist group called the Eden Corps for the government. The mission turned out to be fatal for Oliver, as his arm was connected to a bomb in a plane that was headed for Metropolis. Rather than endanger Metropolis, and refusing to allow his arm to be amputated, he sacrificed himself to let the bomb explode away from the city. With his father dead, Connor decided to take up the mantle of Green Arrow and continue his hero's work.

The new Green Arrow

Connor continued to travel with Eddie, accompanied at times by Connor's martial arts mentor Master Jansen. Connor tried to find his place not only in the hero world, but also in the legacy of Green Arrow. Akin to the friendship between his father and Hal Jordan, Connor became quick friends with the new Green Lantern (Kyle Rayner), who himself was struggling to live up to a legacy. Connor also met Black Canary (Dinah Laurel Lance), Oliver's former and longtime romantic interest, who gave him one of Oliver's old bows, which Connor would use from then on (though the news that Oliver was dead had sent Black Canary, who was already suffering from a string of misfortunes – loss of income from the destruction of her florist shop and the loss of her superhuman ability – into a despair, it was finally ended by her association with Oracle and she was Oracle's agent by the time she finally met Connor).

Besides making other friends such as Robin (Tim Drake), he also made significant enemies in the fighting world, including the Silver Monkey, an assassin and member of the Monkey Fist martial arts cult. Their first encounter resulted in a decisive loss for Connor, which was also filmed and sold underground. Connor's close win in a rematch resulted in a loss of face for the Monkey Fist cult and set Connor on a path that would bring him face to face with Lady Shiva, said to be the deadliest assassin in the world. During the Brotherhood of the Fist storyline, the Monkey Fist schools attacked various world-class martial artists attempting to prove their worthiness and skill after having been dishonored by the Silver Monkey's loss. Under the alias "Paper Monkey," Shiva arrived in Gotham City where Connor had allied with Batman, Nightwing, and Robin. Shiva's final opponent was Connor, who was the prime target of the Monkey Fist. Though a close and taxing contest, Shiva was the victor, with Connor unconscious and defenseless. Thankfully, Shiva's old pupil, Tim Drake who had saved her life during a previous encounter, asked her not to kill Connor, trading a life for a life. After warning Robin that using the favor now meant she would challenge and kill the boy wonder when he was older, she refrained from killing Connor and departed. Batman warned Connor that he would be perceived as surviving a battle with Shiva through his own skill and would therefore be a possible target for any fighters building their way up to a battle against her.

Connor also applied for membership in the JLA, replacing his father. On the date of his second interview, he singlehandedly saved the League from the hands of the Key, defeating the Key's robots by using his father's old trick arrows after the Key had destroyed his own. In the end, he knocked out the Key using his father's trademark boxing glove arrow, and was accepted as a member of the JLA.

He would later be used by Batman as a "traitor" in the League in a ploy to defeat Lex Luthor's Injustice Gang. Connor left the League afterward, feeling he was better suited for the street-level work and out of his element in the epic adventures of the Justice League, although he did remain on reserve status. During this time, he also developed a friendship with Kyle Rayner, the latest Green Lantern, occasionally contacting Kyle for help if he felt that he was dealing with a problem that went beyond his skillset. One unique mission against the Eden Corps- the organisation responsible for Oliver Queen's death- saw Connor team up with a temporally-displaced Hal Jordan, pulled from early in his career as a hero, with the two musing on how they had each never had a chance to know Oliver (As Hal was from a point before he had developed his close ties to the archer). He and Eddie returned for a time to the ashram where Connor was raised, although they both often returned to the outside world, aiding Robin at one point when his Brentwood Academy roommate had been attacked by a demon, and again when Robin, the Spoiler, and Batgirl were attempting to protect Robin's father from an ancient cult.

Return to action
When Oliver returned from the dead, Connor left the ashram and tracked him down. After Connor manages to save his father from warlock Stanley Dover, Connor and Oliver move in together in Star City. The two live with Mia Dearden, a runaway that Oliver has taken in and trained as his new sidekick Speedy. Since returning to the superhero life, Connor has been wounded seriously twice, once by the villain called Onomatopoeia and once by Constantine Drakon, but he continues in his hero role. He is the voice of reason for Oliver, and the two have since formed a real father-son relationship. During his recovery from Onomatopoeia's attack, Oliver Queen and his former sidekick Roy Harper went on a trip across the country recovering old possessions. One of them was an old photograph which revealed that Oliver had been present at Connor's birth, but later ran from the responsibility of being a father. Oliver kept this fact from his son. However, Connor already learned the truth years ago from his mother, and has already forgiven him without Oliver's knowledge.

"One Year Later"
During the 2006 "One Year Later" storyline, Connor is revealed, to be on an island with Mia Dearden and Oliver Queen as Oliver trains for his return to Star City.

In November 2006, Connor starred in his own six issue miniseries, entitled Connor Hawke: Dragon's Blood. It was written by Chuck Dixon with art by Derec Donovan. Dixon stated, "A big surprise leads to major changes in Connor's life, particularly as it relates to his father."

At the end of Tony Bedard's Black Canary miniseries, Connor takes Dinah's adoptive daughter Sin to a safe location at Oliver's request. After the wedding of Oliver and Black Canary, Connor resumes the mantle of Green Arrow after it is believed that his father has once more been killed. Along with Dinah and Batman, Connor is one of the few people who believes that Oliver is still alive. His suspicions are confirmed when it is revealed that Oliver is being held captive by the Amazons, and Connor and Dinah decide to stage a rescue attempt. Following the rescue of Oliver, as the family is reunited, Connor is shot through the chest by League of Assassins members manipulated by Shado. After taking Connor to the hospital, Oliver learns from Mia that Connor already knew of his father's abandonment. The doctors and Hal Jordan are able to save his life, but the bullet was coated with a devastating toxin, leaving Connor in a persistent vegetative state from which he may never emerge. Oliver is devastated by the knowledge that his son may never wake up and that Connor had forgiven him years ago. He vows never to leave his son again.

However, after Oliver and Dinah return home from getting married (the first marriage being void, with an imposter posing as Oliver), the nurses tending to Connor are found dead, with Connor himself missing. Oliver begins a quest to find his missing son. This quest leads him to Doctor Sivana, who has utilized a neural patch to turn Connor into a mindless drone. Connor is rescued by Oliver and returned to his hospital bed, where he finally awakens from his comatose state.

After his coma, however, Connor starts exhibiting several unusual traits. Physically healthy, he's now amnesiac and oblivious to everything happened to him before waking up (even his life as a superhero) and he feels no pain at all and exhibits a strong healing factor, forcing Dinah to ask for outside help.

A brief examination of his physical make-up, made by Batman and Doctor Mid-Nite, reveals how his DNA is now spliced with Plastic Man's, along with several other alterations fully accounting for his new healing factor and his currently very high pain threshold. His memories however come back only in a fragmentary, confused way, with none of the emotional attachments previously experienced, and his archery prowess was absent. To make up for his inability to use ranged weaponry Connor retains his mastery of the martial arts, enhanced by his advanced healing factor, able to close up bullet wounds in mere seconds.

"Blackest Night" and return
During the 2009–2010 "Blackest Night" storyline, Connor travels to Coast City and faces Oliver after he has been transformed into a Black Lantern by Nekron.  Connor once again takes the mantle of Green Arrow. During their battle, Oliver mocks Connor by telling him that he always hated him because he reminded him of how old he was getting. Connor is hesitant to fight his father, but eventually stops him by spraying him with liquid nitrogen, freezing him solid. After Oliver's defeat, Connor, Mia, and Dinah join in the fight against the other Black Lanterns.

After this, Connor returns to the ruins of Star City (which had been destroyed just prior to Blackest Night) and tries to help maintain order. Connor is approached by Oliver, now a fugitive after having murdered Prometheus, the villain that destroyed the city in the first place. Oliver tries to talk to his son, but Connor angrily states that his battle with his Black Lantern father somehow jogged his memory, and that he now remembers all the terrible things Oliver had done to him. When Oliver tells Connor that he had thought he had forgiven him, Connor states that he no longer has the strength to forgive him for his transgressions. Though he refuses to turn Oliver over to the Justice League, he also refuses to help him, instead telling him to do the right thing for once in his life.

Infinite Frontier
Following DC Comics' 2011 reboot of its continuity, The New 52, Green Arrow stories reverted to depicting a young Oliver Queen, with no known son.

Connor is eventually introduced to the post-Flashpoint timeline as a member of the League of Shadows, a splinter faction of the League of Assassins. He enters a fighting tournament held by the League of Lazarus, another offshoot of the Assassins. This version of Connor is shown to be a highly skilled and merciless fighter. He is confirmed to be the estranged illegitimate son of Oliver Queen.

The DC Pride 2022 anthology confirmed that Connor is asexual; "Connor is a character who a number of fans have interpreted to be asexual for decades, as he has often shied away from sexual moments or innuendos". The debut story, titled "Think of Me", was created by an entirely-asexual team consisting of Ro Stein, Ted Brandt, and Frank Cvetkovic.

Ethnicity

Connor is of mixed Asian, African, and European heritage (his mother was of half African American and half Korean descent, while his father, Oliver, is of European ancestry), and was originally depicted with Asiatic features, dark skin, and fair hair and eyes. However, this has not been consistently maintained across different artists and colorists, and when the Green Arrow series was rebooted the character was depicted with European features and light skin (even though a childhood picture in the later Archer's Quest storyline depicted him with dark skin). Connor's original features were later restored with Dixon's Dragon Blood miniseries. He now appears to have a mix of Asian and African facial features, along with his father's blond hair.

The Earth 2 version of Connor Hawke in the New 52 resembles Roy Harper more than his pre-"Flashpoint" counterpart, with light skin and red hair.

Parentage confusion
There's been confusion as to the identity of Connor's mother. Throughout the later issues of the first Green Arrow series written by Chuck Dixon, Connor's mother was identified as Sandra "Moonday" Hawke; a flighty ex-hippie, who had reportedly been one of many conquests for a young Oliver Queen. Moonday played a frequent supporting role in the series, often requiring rescue due to the machinations of her husband - an arms dealer named Milo Armitage, who would be a frequent foe of the new Green Arrow.

Shado, a murderer who also mothered a child with Oliver Queen, is often identified as Connor Hawke's mother. One reason for this is because of a Wizard Magazine issue, which identified Connor's first appearance in comics being in Green Arrow (vol. 2) #24. While this was the first appearance of Shado's infant son (who was later revealed to be named Robert), Connor appeared as a man in his early-twenties in Green Arrow (vol. 2) #0. Both Robert and Connor were seen together, many years apart in age, in Chuck Dixon's 2007 Dragon's Blood miniseries. Furthermore, in Birds of Prey #109, in which Barbara Gordon identifies Shado as Connor Hawke's mother when running down a list of women with whom Oliver Queen cheated on long-time girlfriend Dinah Lance. Writer Tony Bedard acknowledged this as an error on his part.

Powers and abilities

Connor possesses no powers, he is merely an expert archer (although not the natural his father is). Due to his influence most of the "arrow team" has begun to use regular pointed arrows consistently. However, they will still engage in use of trick arrows when needed.

Due to Connor's training in the ashram, he can mimic fighting styles that he witnesses, though this is a learned skill and not a metahuman power. Writer Chuck Dixon used the Brotherhood of the Fist storyline to establish Connor as being among the best hand-to-hand combatants in the world, even going so far as to fight Lady Shiva to a standstill, in a battle for the title of the World's Deadliest Martial Artist. One Year After Infinite Crisis, Connor furthered his training, and like his father and Mia, is able to wield a sword proficiently.

According to the 2007 miniseries, Connor Hawke: Dragon's Blood, Connor has possibly received some measure of immortality, enhanced strength, and speed by bathing in the blood of a dragon. However, no mention of this has been made since the miniseries.

After the events told in the Green Arrow and Black Canary 2008 series, Connor is infected with a brain-damaging neurotoxin and spliced with DNA coming from Plastic Man and other still unnamed sources; as a result, he's left largely amnesiac and unable to wield a bow with the necessary ability and coordination, but he's granted a highly effective healing factor and an even higher pain threshold. His martial arts mastery however is not influenced by his brain damage: in fact, coupled with his newly discovered metahuman powers, this makes him a feared warrior, almost unable to be deterred by pain and wounds. During the battle with Oliver during the Blackest Night, Connor is shown to be very proficient in the use of Japanese shuriken. After the Blackest Night,  Connor regained his memories.

The post-Flashpoint version of Connor is shown to be a highly skilled hand-to-hand combatant, considered a match for Damian Wayne and capable of fighting off multiple opponents simultaneously. He is at the very least proficient with archery.

Other versions

DC Animated Universe Comics
Connor Hawke appears in Adventures in the DC Universe #13 and #16.

Earth-16
The Earth-16 version of the character appears in The Multiversity: The Just #1 (December, 2014). He is son of Oliver Queen and the father of Arrowette. He is a member of Justice League.

Injustice
In the tie-in comic for Injustice: Gods Among Us, Black Canary names her and Oliver's son Connor. Doctor Fate brought both Black Canary and her son to a parallel universe following Green Arrow's death, where the former's counterpart has long died and its Oliver Queen has retired his role as Green Arrow and becomes a recluse. After meeting the Black Canary, the alternate Oliver decides to raise Connor as his son with the baby's mother. In Injustice 2, Black Canary, Prime Earth Green Arrow, and Connor are revealed to have returned to Connor and Dinah's original universe after the fall of Superman's Regime after the Prime Earth Superman defeated his corrupted counterpart. Black Canary and Prime Earth Green Arrow assist Batman in fighting crime and rebuilding the world; the young Connor displays an excellent marksmanship like his late-father under Prime Earth Green Arrow's tutelage and having his mother's metahuman power.

Earth 2
In 2011, "The New 52" rebooted the DC universe. A revised interpretation of Connor Hawke appears in the series Earth 2, which is set in an alternative universe within the DC Comics Multiverse. In Earth 2 Annual #1, an archer named Red Arrow debuts and is recruited to join the World Army; he is believed to be identified by the name Roy McQueen. It is revealed that his name is Connor Hawke. This version of Connor is seemingly killed by monsters unleashed by the invading forces of the planet Apokolips. The series The New 52: Futures End shows a successor Earth 2 Red Arrow to be Oliver Queen.

In other media

Television

Arrowverse

 A character known as "Connor Hawke" appeared in the Legends of Tomorrow season one episodes "Fail-Safe" and "Star City 2046", portrayed by Joseph David-Jones. He is the Earth-16 version of John Diggle, Jr and the son of John Diggle's Earth-16 counterpart. He appears as Green Arrow in Star City. Blaming himself for his father's death, he feels undeserving of his name and instead takes on the alias Connor Hawke. He becomes the new Green Arrow after he believes Earth-16 Oliver had died, and tries to defend the city from the new Deathstroke, Earth-16 Grant Wilson. After defeating Deathstroke together, he and Oliver partner to rebuild Star City. In the crossover "Crisis on Infinite Earths", it is retroactively established that this reality is not the future of Earth-1 but Earth-16's.
 Arrow's season seven introduces flashforwards that take place in 2040 and feature Connor Hawke, once again played by Joseph David-Jones. However, this version is not John Diggle, Jr., but the son of Ben Turner, later adopted by John Diggle and Lyla Michaels. He is an agent of Knightwatch, who are described as a "good version of A.R.G.U.S.", and works alongside Mia Smoak, the daughter of Oliver and Felicity. The eighth season reveals that Connor Hawke has an estranged brother named John Diggle Jr. (portrayed by Charlie Barnett) who is the leader of the Deathstroke Gang.
 In Arrow, Oliver fathered his illegitimate son, William Clayton, with his college classmate Samantha Clayton. The character is later introduced in its spin-off The Flash, as a preadolescent portrayed by Jack Moore. After Samantha's death, Oliver takes his son in, providing William a family after he marries Felicity Smoak. The season seven flashforwards feature an adult William (played by Ben Lewis) teaming up with a group of vigilantes, including his half-sister Mia, to save Star City from the Galaxy One company. The adult William is shown to be openly gay, the fact that his father and stepmother have known for years since he was a teenager.

Video games
 A character named Connor Lance-Queen appeared in Injustice 2. He is the son of Green Arrow and Black Canary. He and his parents go back to their original world so Black Canary and Green Arrow can assist Batman with Connor being taken care of by a babysitter while his parents are off fighting the Society and Brainiac's forces. In Black Canary's single player ending, she discovers that Connor has inherited her sonic scream, allowing him to fight off the Brainiac forces attacking him indicating he is a Metahuman like his mother. Connor also makes a cameo appearance in Harley Quinn's Ending, where he is shown in the background with his parents as Harley is spending time with her daughter Lucy (under the guise as Lucy's aunt as Lucy is unaware that Harley is her biological mother).

References

African-American superheroes
Asian-American superheroes
Buddhism in comics
Characters created by Jim Aparo
Characters created by Kelley Puckett
Comics characters introduced in 1994
DC Comics American superheroes
DC Comics characters with accelerated healing
DC Comics LGBT superheroes
DC Comics martial artists
DC Comics metahumans
Fictional archers
Fictional asexuals
Fictional swordfighters in comics
Fictional characters from California
Korean superheroes